The United States Army Vessel Malvern Hill (LCU 2025) is a Landing Craft Utility of the .  Though currently assigned to the 481st Transportation Company (Heavy Boat) (U.S. Army Reserve), which is headquartered in Port Hueneme, California, the craft is berthed in Tacoma, Washington.  The vessel's namesake is the battle of Malvern Hill in the U.S. Civil War.

References
Notes

Runnymede-class large landing craft
Landing craft
Ships built in Gulfport, Mississippi
Ships of the United States Army